Gianni Rocca (13 June 1929 – 11 August 2013) was an Italian sprinter (400 m) and the Italian flag bearer at the 1948 Summer Olympics.

Biography
Rocca was born in Milan. He participated, with the Italy national relay team, in the 4 x 400 metres at two editions of the Summer Olympics (1948 and 1952).

See also
 List of flag bearers for Italy at the Olympics

References

External links
 

1929 births
2013 deaths
Athletes from Milan
Italian male sprinters
Athletes (track and field) at the 1948 Summer Olympics
Athletes (track and field) at the 1952 Summer Olympics
Olympic athletes of Italy